Until 1965, New Brunswick highways were numbered consecutively from 1 to 42. A massive renumbering led to the current three-tier system. Some changes have taken place to highway numbering since then, and the following numbers are no longer used:

Route 2A—2 sections:
Fredericton-Saint John area—Fredericton to Saint John via Broad Road; Designated as Route 7.
Moncton area—Salisbury to Sackville, via Downtown Moncton, after Moncton Bypass was built in the early 1960s; Designated as Route 6 in 1965 (see below), then Route 106 in 1984.
Route 2B
Route 5 (1927-1981)—Original route now designated as Route 555; Route 5 realigned and renumbered as Route 95.
Route 6 (1927-1965)—Renumbered Route 555; now Route 110
Route 6 (1965-1984)—Designated as Route 106 in 1984.
Route 7 (1927-1965)—renumbered Route 19, now Route 190
Route 9 (1927-196?)—Fredericton to Sussex, later part of Route 2; now part of Route 105 and Route 10.
Route 9 (196?-?)—Route 1 to Quispamsis; now part of Route 100.
Route 9A
Route 12 (1927-1965)—Newcastle to Chatham (Miramichi region); this section was absorbed as part of route 126 in 1965.
Route 12 (1965-1976)—Fredericton - Oromocto (Vanier Highway); now designated as part of route 7.
Route 13 (1927-1965) —Pokemouche to Miscou Island; Now designated as Route 113.
Route 14 (1927-1965)—Now designated as Route 114
Route 14 (1965-1984)—St-Jacques to St-Basile via Edmundston downtown; now designated as part of route 144.
Route 18—Grand Falls to US Border near Hamlin, ME; now designated as route 218.
Route 19 (1927-1965)—Limestone to US Border; now designated as route 375.
Route 19—Perth-Andover to US Border; now designated as route 190.
Route 20—Edmundston to Quebec border, by Lac Baker; now designated as route 120.
Route 20A—Caron Brook to Connors via Clair; now designated as route 161 and route 205.
Route 21—Fredericton to Grand Falls; now designated as route 105.
Route 22—Grand Falls to north of Perth; now designated as route 108.
Route 23—Three Brooks to Nictau; now designated as route 108.
Route 24—Hartland to Mouth of Keswick; now designated as route 104.
Route 25—Fredericton to Boiestown; now designated as routes 620 and 625.
Route 25A—Stanley to Nashwaak Bridge; now designated as part of route 107.
Route 26—Maine (Forest City) to Meductic; now designated as part of route 122.
Route 27—Andersonville to St. Croix; now designated as route 630.
Route 28—Welsford to Fredericton; now designated as route 101.
Route 29—Saint John to Sussex; now designated as route 111.
Route 30—Coles Island to Salisbury; now designated as route 112.
Route 31—Moncton to Cocagne via St-Antoine; now designated as route 115.
Route 32—Parts of it now designated as route 132.
Route 33—Moncton to Miramichi; now designated as route 126.
Route 34—Chipman to Rexton; now designated as route 116.
Route 35—Now designated as route 135.
Route 36
Route 37—Now designated as route 440.
Route 38—Dalhousie to Campbellton, via Eel River Crossing, Balmoral and Val D'Amours; now designated as Route 275, but extended through St-Arthur via former Route 270.
Route 39
Route 40—Now designated as route 124.
Route 41—Now designated as route 127.
Route 42—Now designated as route 560.
Route 96 (unsigned) -- Royree Road (2 km west of New Brunswick Route 720) - Route 3 in St. Stephen, New Brunswick (via St. Stephen Drive; now entirely absorbed by Route 1)
Route 106 (1965-1968)—  Hartland - Perth-Andover (Now part of Routes 103 and 130)
Route 106 (1976-1984)— Oromocto - Route 7 at Geary (Became part of Route 660; now unnumbered)
Route 110 (1965)
Route 125—Perth-Andover - Grand Falls (Now part of Route 105)
Route 142—Saint John - Grand Bay (via Westfield Road)
Route 191—Bathurst - Janeville (via Bridge Street/Cape Road)
Route 192
Route 270—Campbellton - Val d'Amour - Route 275 (via Val d'Amour Road)
Route 393—Plaster Rock - Hazeldean (Now part of Route 108)
Route 520
Route 545
Route 555 (1965-1976)—Florenceville-Bristol - Maine (Now Route 110)
Route 650
Route 660—Oromocto - Geary - Blissville (via Broad Road/Branch Road)
Route 685
Route 720—Route 725 to Route 170 in Saint Stephen via Church Street (Now part of Route 725)
Route 765—Lawrence Station - Waweig (Now part of Route 127)
Route 810
Route 930—Upper Sackville - Haute Aboujagane (via Upper Aboujagane Road)

References

New Brunswick provincial highways
 
Highways